Seth Simon Oscar Howander (6 October 1892 – 14 September 1981) was a Swedish ice hockey, bandy and football player who competed in the 1920 Summer Olympics.

In 1920 he was a member of the Swedish ice hockey team which finished fourth in the Summer Olympics tournament. He played five matches as goaltender. Ice hockey didn't exist in Sweden at the time, so Howander and the other Swedish players were bandy players.

References

External links
 
profile

1892 births
1981 deaths
Ice hockey players at the 1920 Summer Olympics
IFK Uppsala Bandy players
Olympic ice hockey players of Sweden
Swedish bandy players
Swedish ice hockey goaltenders